Kareli railway station is a railway station in Kareli city of Madhya Pradesh. Its code is KY. It serves Kareli city. The station consists of two platforms. Passenger, Express and Superfast trains halt here.

References

Railway stations in Narsinghpur district
Jabalpur railway division